Maria Morena (20 February 1929 – 22 February 2003) was active in her career in theater and film from 1950 to 1962. Among her accomplishments as an actress she starred in the film Sob o Céu da Bahia, the Brazilian adventure film directed by Ernesto Remani awarded an entry into the 9th Cannes Film Festival in 1956. Her casting photos may be accessed by the web site of de Conteúdos Culturais, of Brazil.

Maria Morena was born Lea Castello in Rio de Janeiro. She married Willison Norman Barnett in Baltimore, MD in 1952. Lea Castello Barnett was also a famed sculptor; her artist name was "Lotiz". Presently some of her work is presented at the Museu Afro Brasil in Parque Ibirapuera, São Paulo, Brazil.

References

1929 births
2003 deaths
Brazilian actresses